Haedropleura septangularis, common name the seven-ribbed conelet, is a species of sea snail, a marine gastropod mollusk in the family Horaiclavidae.

It was previously included within the family Turridae, the turrids.

Description
The size of an adult shell varies between 9 mm and 12 mm. The shell is pale yellowish or almost white, with distant strong ribs. The shoulder has brown dashes or spots, appearing on the ribs only. There is usually, on the body whorl a central line of spots, also on the ribs.

Distribution
This species occurs in the Mediterranean Sea and off the Atlantic coast of Spain, Madeira and the Canaries; also off Mauritania.

References

 Montagu, G. (1803) Testacea Britannica or natural history of British shells, marine, land, and fresh-water, including the most minute: systematically arranged and embellished with figures. J. White, London, 291 pp. 
 Gofas, S.; Le Renard, J.; Bouchet, P. (2001). Mollusca. in: Costello, M.J. et al. (eds), European Register of Marine Species: a check-list of the marine species in Europe and a bibliography of guides to their identification. Patrimoines Naturels. 50: 180–213

External links
 
  Tucker, J.K. 2004 Catalog of recent and fossil turrids (Mollusca: Gastropoda). Zootaxa 682:1–1295.
 Biolib.cz: Photo of a shell of Haedropleura septangularis
 MNHN, Paris : Mangelia ginnania

septangularis